Nuffield Health is the United Kingdom's largest healthcare charity. Established in 1957 the charity operates 31 Nuffield Health Hospitals and 114 Nuffield Health Fitness & Wellbeing Centres. It is independent of the National Health Service and is constituted as a registered charity. Its objectives are to 'advance, promote and maintain health and healthcare of all descriptions and to prevent, relieve and cure sickness and ill health of any kind, all for the public benefit.'

As a private provider, fees are charged to patients. In 2019 Nuffield Health had an annual gross income of £993 million, making it one of the five largest charities in the UK. 

Nuffield Health operates 250 facilities including 31 private hospitals (29 in England, one in Glasgow, Scotland and a joint venture, Cardiff & Vale, Wales), 113 Fitness and Wellbeing Centres across the UK, and five medical centres.

History 

On 14 January 1957 the British United Provident Association (BUPA) established the Nursing Homes Charitable Trust to acquire and build community facilities equipped for the demands of modern medicine. In 1957 the President of BUPA, Lord Nuffield, suggested the charity might benefit from incorporating his name so was re-registered as the Nuffield Nursing Homes Trust (NNHT).

At this time the Trust purchased the Strathallan nursing home in Bournemouth for £23,150. It was closed for ten months to be refurbished and reopened as the first Nuffield Hospital. In its first ten years, the Trust acquired and modernised a total of six dilapidated nursing homes and built seven new ones, together providing more than 400 beds.

The earliest purpose-built hospital opened at Woking in 1962; others followed at Exeter, Shrewsbury, Hull, Birmingham and Slough. In 1966, the NNHT opened a new flagship hospital in London's Bryanston Square, at a cost of over half a million pounds. The Trust ran all sites on a strictly self-supporting basis, though non-profit-making lines. Charges from patients were expected to cover not only operating costs but repairs and depreciation.

By 1982 the Nuffield Nursing Homes Trust had grown to 31 hospitals and 1,076 beds. In 1983, the trading name was changed to Nuffield Hospitals, the 'nursing homes' element no longer conveyed the focus on modern hospitals rather than nursing homes.

A new direction was taken in 2005 when Tweed Park and Sona Fitness were acquired and merged to become Proactive Health, a new business arm providing clinical health services to public and corporate members. In 2007 Cannons Health & Fitness was acquired increasing services to include physiotherapy, weight management and health assessments.

In July 2008 Nuffield Hospitals, Proactive Health and Cannons merged to become Nuffield Health, connecting fitness, prevention and treatment under a single brand, governance and management structure. The acquisition in 2014 of a further nine health clubs from Virgin Active, LA Fitness in Chester and in 2015 a further two sites in London (CityPoint, Moorgate and Market Sports, Shoreditch) broadened the Nuffield Health national network of Fitness & Wellbeing Gyms to 77 branches.

Development

In 2016, Nuffield Health acquired 35 Virgin Active clubs. Unconfirmed rumours put the value of the acquisition at £80 million.

Nuffield Health received planning permission in 2016 to build a new hospital on a  site adjacent to the Manchester Royal Infirmary.

In 2016, Nuffield Health announced their acquisition of cognitive behavioural therapy services into their health and wellbeing services, offering emotional wellbeing services across Britain within fitness and wellbeing gyms and hospitals.

In October 2016 the company formed a partnership with Doctor Care Anywhere, an online primary care provider, which allow their corporate clients to offer employees 20 minute virtual GP appointments, at any time between 8a.m. and 10p.m. to suit their convenience, whether they are in the UK or abroad.

Awards 
Nuffield Health has won multiple awards, including:
 Infection Prevention Society Practitioner of the Year 2016, Sue Millward – IPS Awards
 Best Healthcare & Social Employer runner up 2016 – Bloomberg Best Employers
 Bronze Award 2016 from the Defence Employer Recognition Scheme
 Best brand architecture solution bronze, Best use of typography bronze and Best visual identity from the healthcare and pharmaceuticals sector bronze 2016 – Transform Awards
 Best workplace wellbeing provider 2012, 2013, and 2014 – Health Insurance Awards
 Integrated Corporate Wellbeing 2008, 2009, 2010 and 2011 – Flame
 Management Excellence 2010 – Laing and Buisson
 Risk Management 2009 – Laing and Buisson

See also
Private healthcare in the United Kingdom
List of hospitals in England
List of hospitals in Scotland

References

External links

Scottish Charity Regulator. Nuffield Health, registered charity no. SCO41793
Nuffield Health website

Health care companies of the United Kingdom
Health charities in the United Kingdom
Health clubs in the United Kingdom
Organisations founded by Viscount Nuffield